An eight-member IHSAA-Sanctioned Athletic Conference within the Northeastern Indiana counties of Adams, Allen, DeKalb, Huntington, Noble, Wells, and Whitley. The conference was started in 1989 as the Northeast Hoosier Conference when six schools from the Northeastern Indiana Athletic Conference (Bellmont, Columbia City, DeKalb, East Noble, Homestead, and New Haven) joined with two schools from the Allen County Athletic Conference (Fort Wayne Carroll and Norwell). When the smaller six schools decided to pull out of the conference in 2015, the conference essentially ceased to exist, forcing the much larger Carroll and Homestead into joining the Summit Athletic Conference. The remaining schools, while settling on the current league name, added Huntington North of the North Central Conference and Leo of the Allen County Athletic Conference, who are more similar in size to the rest of the schools. While the six NEHC schools technically dropped out, they never actually left the league, having succeeded in forcing out the two large Fort Wayne schools, ended up staying in the league. This is not an unheard of tactic, as most notably Ohio's Chagrin Valley Conference pulled virtually the same move around the same time.

Membership

Former Members (As Northeast Hoosier Conference)

State Championships

Bellmont (8)
 1987 Wrestling
 1988 Wrestling
 1994 Wrestling
 2007 Volleyball (3A)
 2008 Football (3A)
 2010 Volleyball (3A)
 2016 Wrestling
 2020 Wrestling

Columbia City (0)

DeKalb (3)

 1980 Baseball
 1986 Football (4A)
 2021 Unified Flag Football

East Noble (1)

 2000 Football (4A)

Leo (6)

 2014 Softball (3A)

 2012 Hockey (3A)
 2014 Hockey (4A)
 2016 Hockey (3A)

 2018 Rugby (D-1)
 2019 Rugby (D-1)

Carroll (2)

 2010 Baseball (4A)
 2011 Baseball (4A)

Homestead (10)

 1983 Gymnastics
 1984 Gymnastics
 1985 Gymnastics
 1990 Hockey (AA)
 1991 Hockey (A)
 1995 Hockey (AA)
 1996 Gymnastics
 1999 Gymnastics
 2001 Gymnastics
2015 Boys Basketball

Huntington North (2) 

1990 Girls Basketball
1995 Girls Basketball

New Haven (0)

Norwell (3)

 2003 Baseball (3A)
 2007 Baseball (3A)
 2013 Baseball (3A)

Notable athletes
Rob Bowen, Major League Baseball Catcher
Chandler Harnish, [Norwell] Northern Illinois, Indianapolis Colts Quarterback
Jarrod Parker, [Norwell] Major League Baseball Pitcher
Josh VanMeter, [Norwell] Major League Baseball Second Baseman,Utility
Dave Doster, New Haven High School, Major League Baseball, Philadelphia Phillies 2nd Baseman

Resources 
 Northeast Hoosier Conference Football
 IHSAA Conferences
 IHSAA Directory

Indiana high school athletic conferences
High school sports conferences and leagues in the United States